Motörhead, an English rock band.

Motorhead may also refer to:
Motörhead (album), Motörhead's 1977 debut album.
"Motorhead" (song), a song (most notably) recorded by Hawkwind and Motörhead.
Motorhead (comics), a character and series from Dark Horse Comics.
Motorhead (video game), a 1998 automobile racing video game.
Jim "Motorhead" Sherwood, a member of The Mothers of Invention.

See also
"Motorhead Baby", a 1952 song by Johnny "Guitar" Watson
Mottershead